Kidnapping, Caucasian Style! (informally referred to as the Kidnapping, Caucasian Style 2 version) is a Russian comedy film by director Maxim Voronkov. A remake of the 1967 film of the same name, it has a humorous plot revolving around bride kidnapping, an old tradition that used to exist in certain regions of the North Caucasus.

Dedicated to the memory of Ilya Oleynikov, the film premiered on August 21, 2014. As was the case with the original, filming was done in the Crimea, not in the North Caucasus. The movie was met with strongly negative reviews in the Russian media, with some considering it being one of the worst films made to date, and it was a box-office bomb.

Plot 
The plot as a whole repeats the story of the original comedy: journalist Shurik arrives in the Caucasus in order to study local culture and folklore, the ancient customs and traditions of the people in this region. Per chance he meets and befriends a girl in a mountainous town, the beauty Nina, which the gouvernor, wealthy and powerful local Saakhov, is planning to marry — if not willingly then by force. Using the gullible journalist as a strawman, Saakhov and his henchmen (the "Coward", the "Fool", and the "Pro", a trio of comic antiheros) are able to kidnap Nina, all seems to work according to plan. But realizing that he had been deceived, Shurik, who fell for Nina, rushes to rescue his beloved one, for a happy ending.

Nevertheless, in the new version of the film there are some differences from the original. For example, Nina is falling in love with Shurik not by coincidence, but when fate has it that they repeatedly are clashing together, and both come closer to each other from the very beginning of the film. Also, the ending of the story was changed.

Cast
 Dmitry Sharakois as Shurik the journalist (voiced by Sergey Burunov)
 Anastasia Zadorozhnaya as the beauty Nina
 Gennady Khazanov as gouvernor Saakhov
 Semyon Strugachyov as the "Coward"
 Nikolai Dobrynin as the "Fool"
 Sergey Stepanchenko as the "Pro"
 Mikhail Yefremov as hotel administrator
 Yuli Gusman as head physician of the psychiatric hospital
 Ruslana Pysanka as taxi driver
 Euclid Kyurdzidis as policeman
 Larisa Udovichenko as nurse

Criticism 
Reception of the movie was strongly negative. Negative reviews of the film have been published in Afisha, in Komsomolskaya Pravda, in Gazeta.Ru, and in Mail.ru. Most critics viewed the remake as a bad copy of the original, which it reproduces almost frame by frame; with the rare moments of originality being unsuccessful. Vladimir Medinsky, Russia's Minister of Culture, promised not to provide any further funding for Voronkov's films after an appeal from YouTube critic BadComedian. Voronkov has not directed another film since.

At the website Megacritic the production scored 25 points out of 100, and at KinoPoisk only 1.1 out of 10 points. The film was also a flop at the box office, collecting $179,843 on a budget of $3.5 million.

References

External links

2014 romantic comedy films
Films about kidnapping
Films scored by Aleksandr Zatsepin
Remakes of Russian films
Russian romantic comedy films
Russian sequel films
2010s Russian-language films
Films set in the Soviet Union